Ignatius Cockshutt (August 24, 1812 – March 1, 1901) was a Canadian businessman and philanthropist. The son of James Cockshutt and Mary Nightingale, he was born in Bradford, Yorkshire, England. He came to Canada with his parents in July 1827.

Biography 

In 1828, his father established himself as a general merchant in York, and soon opened a branch in Brantford, Canada West which Ignatius clerked for his father. After a rocky start at the branch location, it was ultimately successful to the point that the York business was closed and the operation consolidated in Brantford.

In 1840, Ignatius and his sister Jane purchased the business from their father and operated it until 1846 when Ignatius purchased his sister's share. He operated the business very successfully until 1882 as his main occupation.

Along with his son James, in 1877 he founded the original Cockshutt factory, the Brantford Plow Works at Brantford, Ontario.

In 1882, the business was incorporated as the Cockshutt Plow Company, with James G. Cockshutt as president and Ignatius as vice-president. At that time, they employed about 50 workers. After James' death in 1885, the company was operated by three of Ignatius' sons in succession and by a Cockshutt family member until 1957, when outside interests gained control of the company.

After his withdrawal from his active businesses, he spent considerable time and money on various charity and philanthropic causes. He was a devout Inghamite Methodist and remained committed to its teachings of charity and evangelism.

He married Margaret Gemmel on September 22, 1846 with whom he had one child named Mary. Margaret died in 1847. Three years later, on September 9, 1850, he married Elizabeth Foster and had eight more surviving children with her. In total he had nine children that survived into adulthood, and three who died in infancy.

References 
 Biography at the Dictionary of Canadian Biography Online
 Brantford Library Records, Memoirs of Ignatius Cockshutt, consisting chiefly of his own reminiscences (1903)

1812 births
1901 deaths
Businesspeople from Ontario
19th-century Canadian businesspeople
English emigrants to Canada
19th-century Canadian philanthropists